Valentiny is a surname. Notable people with the surname include:

Ágoston Valentiny (1888–1958), Hungarian politician and jurist
François Valentiny (born 1953), Luxembourgian architect
János Valentiny (1842–1902), Hungarian painter

See also
Valentine (name)
Valentino (surname)